Pilosella levieri (synonym Hieracium longiscapum) is a species of flowering plant in the family Asteraceae.

References

levieri